The Wonder Wheel is an eccentric Ferris wheel at Deno's Wonder Wheel Amusement Park, Coney Island, New York, US.

Wonder Wheel may also refer to:

Cycling
 Wonder Wheels; The Autobiography of Eileen Sheridan, English cyclist
 Wonder Wheels, slogan used by Hercules Cycle and Motor Company, sponsors of Eileen Sheridan

Film and television
 Wonder Wheel (film), a drama directed by Woody Allen
 Wonder Wheels, a cartoon produced by Hanna-Barbera Productions

Music
 Wonder Wheel (album), by American band The Klezmatics 
 "Wonder Wheel", a song from the album The Future That Was by American band Josh Joplin Group

Sport
 Wonder Wheel (horse), an American thoroughbred race horse

Other uses
 Wonder Wheel, a search interface featured at Google Searchology